Yanbian University is one of the key universities of the People's Republic of China, located at Yanji, Yanbian Korean Autonomous Prefecture, Jilin Province. It is a Chinese state Double First Class University, included in the Double First Class University Plan.

History
Yanbian University is a comprehensive university endowed with distinct ethnic characteristics. Yanbian University through decades of unremitting efforts has been chosen as a key institution supported by the State “211Project”, a strongly backed university in China’s western development campaign, and a key university jointly supported by both the Ministry of Education and Jilin Province.

Founded in 1949, Yanbian University was one of the earliest founded universities by CPC in the ethnic minority region. Since then, the CPC Central Committee and the State Council have paid close attention to its development, and many Party and State leaders, such as Zhou Enlai, Zhu De, Dong Biwu, Hu Yaobang, Jiang Zemin, Jia Qinglin, Li Lanqing and Zhang Dejiang have successively inspected the university.

It consists of 21 colleges offering 73 undergraduate specialties under 12 disciplinary branches except military science, which contains 6 first level disciplines authorized to offer doctorate degree with more than 50 doctoral programs, 24 first level disciplines authorized to offer master's degree with 149 master’s programs and 4 centers for post-doctoral studies. It has 1 key state-level disciplines and 12 key provincial-level disciplines.

The university has a faculty body of 2338, among whom there are about 1318 full-time teachers, more than 789 full professors and associate professors. It has also engaged over 300 noted domestic and overseas scholars and experts as its honorary professors, part-time professors or guest professors, one of whom is Dr. Yang Chen Ning, the winner of the Nobel Prize in Physics.

The university is recruiting students from 29 provinces and autonomous regions. Studying at 21 schools in the multicultural family are more than 23000 full-time students, including over 3700 doctoral candidates and postgraduates, about 18000 undergraduates, 800 college students and more than 600 international students from 34 countries.

It is the only university in China that employs Korean as an official medium of instruction in addition to Chinese.

Programs
The university offers eleven programs in economics, philosophy, law, pedagogy, literature, history, science, engineering, agriculture, medicine and management. It consists of twelve colleges, which offer 70 bachelor's degree programs, 78 master's degree programs and 22 doctoral degree programs.

Faculty
In 2004, the student body included 16,000 undergraduates, 3,000 postgraduates, 143 doctoral candidates, 700 foreign students and 4,674 adult students. Most foreign students come from South Korea, Japan, the United States and Russia. The faculty comprises 1,300 full-time teachers of whom 700 are professors and associate professors.

International cooperation
The university is affiliated with major universities in South Korea  as well as some academic institutions in North Korea.

References

External links
Yanbian University official website 

 
Universities and colleges in Jilin
Education in Yanbian
Educational institutions established in 1949
1949 establishments in China